The 2013 Judo Grand Prix Jeju was held in Jeju City, South Korea from 7 to 8 December 2013.

Medal summary

Men's events

Women's events

Source Results

Medal table

References

External links
 

2013 IJF World Tour
2013 Judo Grand Prix
Judo competitions in South Korea
Judo
Judo